Dim Dam is a concrete-face rock-fill dam on the Dim River located  east of Alanya in Antalya Province, Turkey. Constructed between 1996 and 2007, the development was backed by the Turkish State Hydraulic Works. Additionally, the dam supplies a 38 MW hydroelectric power plant with water.

See also
List of dams and reservoirs in Turkey

References

Dams in Antalya Province
Concrete-face rock-fill dams
Dams completed in 2007